Ichchapuram Municipality is the local self government in Ichchapuram of the Indian state of Andhra Pradesh. It is classified as a 3rd Grade Municipality. It constitutes total population of 36,493.

Administration

Ichchapuram municipality was formed in the year 1986. The present municipal commissioner of the town is CH.Satyanarayana.

See also
 List of municipalities in Andhra Pradesh

References

1986 establishments in Andhra Pradesh
Government agencies established in 1986
Municipal Councils in Andhra Pradesh